

The Teram Kangri group is a mountain massif in the remote Siachen Muztagh, a subrange of the Karakoram range. The high point of the group, and of the Siachen Muztagh, is Teram Kangri I. The peak lies on the boundary between disputed China controlled Trans-Karakoram Tract and the disputed Siachen Glacier controlled by India. The northeast side of the peak is in Chinese-controlled territory, the southwest side is controlled by India.
Teram Kangri I was first climbed on August 10, 1975, by a Japanese expedition led by H. Katayama, which obtained a permit from the Govt. of Pakistan and made the long approach via Bilafond La (the Saltoro Pass). They climbed the SW ridge of Teram Kangri II and then took the East ridge to the top. Teram Kangri II was climbed on August 12 and 13 by six Japanese climbers.

Teram Kangri II (7,407 m) was climbed in 1978 by an Indian Army expedition led by Colonel Narendra Kumar in the first move by India to lay claim to the Siachen Glacier area.  Teram Kangri I has been climbed once since, in 1992. The expedition approached through Indian territory.

Teram Kangri III  (7,382 m ranked 73rd, Prominence = 500 m) was first climbed in 1979 by a Japanese expedition led by S. Hanada. Their route crossed over Bilafond La, much like the first ascent of Teram Kangri I.

References

Sources
 Wala, Jerzy Orographical Sketch Map of the Karakoram, Swiss Foundation for Alpine Research, Zurich, 1990.
 
 Himalayan Index

Seven-thousanders of the Karakoram
Mountains of Ladakh
Mountains of Xinjiang
International mountains of Asia
China–India border
Mountain ranges of the Karakoram